Joseph Prince (born 15 May 1963) is a Singaporean evangelist and the senior pastor of New Creation Church, which is based in Singapore. He was one of the church's founders in 1983.

Background
Prince was born in Singapore, the son of a Sikh priest of Indian origin and a Chinese mother. He studied at Commonwealth Secondary School and completed his A levels at a private school, Our Lady of Lourdes.

He adopted the name Joseph Prince while serving as an IT consultant, just before being appointed senior pastor in 1990.

Aside from Singapore, Prince has preached at churches overseas in Australia, Canada, Great Britain, Italy, Indonesia, the Netherlands, Norway, South Africa and the United States.

In 2010, He was featured in Charisma magazine.

Compensation
On 5 October 2008, in an interview with the Sunday Times, Prince, also the executive chairman of the church council, acknowledged that he was "well-paid" with his salary going up $50,000 a month.

On 30 March 2009, The Straits Times reported that the church had paid one employee between $500,001 and $550,000 in its last financial year. Under the recommendations of the Code of Governance for charities then, all charities and non-profit organisations in Singapore were encouraged to disclose the salary bands of their top executives to the Commissioner of Charities. While not confirming the identity of the employee, the church responded that its policy is to "recognize and reward key contributors to the church and Senior Pastor Prince is the main pillar of our church's growth and revenue." On 15 April 2009, Deacon Matthew Kang, the church chairman, responded that it was not a public charity and did not solicit public donations, asserting that "there is absolutely no compulsion to give whether in tithes or offerings, and any giving is done out of a willing heart", and that "every giver is appreciated and it is taken in good faith that he believes in the elected leadership and will trust them to make good decisions for the particular church he has chosen to attend, whether as a member or a visitor."

In October 2014, a list published by entertainment website richestlifestyle.com placed Prince as the 10th richest pastor in the world, with a reported net worth of S$6.4 million (£3.13 million). New Creation Church denied the report, claiming that his actual net worth was "substantially lower" than the reported figure and that it regarded Prince's net worth as "personal in nature".

On 28 October 2014, The Straits Times reported that according to a 2012 tax document filed, Prince had not received any compensation from Joseph Prince Ministries or "any related organisations. The report further stated that the New Creation Church council had stated that Prince had not received any salary from the organisation since 2009.

Personal life
Joseph Prince is married to Wendy Prince. They have a daughter and a son.

Publications

Right Place Right Time (2008)

The Benjamin Generation (2011)
Health and Wholeness Through the Holy Communion (2011)
Healing Promises (2012)
Provision Promises (2013)
The Power of Right Believing (2013)
Grace Revolution: Experience the Power to Live Above Defeat (2015)
Glorious Grace: 100 Daily Readings from Grace Revolution (2015)

Live the Let-Go Life: Breaking Free from Stress, Worry, and Anxiety (2017)
No More Mind Games: Win Over Discouragement and Depression (2018)
Anchored: Finding Peace in The Storms of Life (2018)
Give Me This Mountain: Faith to go from Barely Surviving to Actually Thriving (2020)
Expedition Promised Land: Walk Where Jesus Walked (2021)

References

External links
 New Creation Church
 Joseph Prince Ministries

1963 births
Singaporean people of Indian descent
Living people
Converts to Christianity from Sikhism
Singaporean Pentecostals
Singaporean Christian clergy
Singaporean religious leaders
Television evangelists
Singaporean people of Chinese descent
Singaporean people of Punjabi descent